At the 1978 Commonwealth Games, the athletics events were held at the Commonwealth Stadium in Edmonton, Alberta, Canada. A total of 38 events were contested, 23 for men and 15 for women.

Medal summary

Men

Women

Medal table

Participating nations

 (5)
 (44)
 (6)
 (1)
 (6)
 (1)
 (19)
 (78)
 (2)
 (1)
 (87)
 (10)
 (16)
 (3)
 (2)
 (3)
 (9)
 (6)
 (20)
 (1)
 (45)
 (8)
 (5)
 (5)
 (28)
 (13)
 (2)
 (6)
 (4)
 (25)
 (3)
 (1)
 (1)
 (1)
 (16)
 (12)
 (5)
 (16)
 (4)

References
Commonwealth Games Medallists - Men. GBR Athletics. Retrieved on 2010-07-21.
Commonwealth Games Medallists - Women. GBR Athletics. Retrieved on 2010-07-21.

 
1978 Commonwealth Games events
1978
Commonwealth Games
1978 Commonwealth Games